TFB may refer to:

 "Too Fucking Bad" - Instant message abbreviation
 Trust fund baby - A person who lives off of family wealth
 Toys for Bob - A small video game developer
 Thin-film battery - A type of rechargeable battery
 Archaeal transcription factor B - a protein involved in archaeal transcription.
 The Front Bottoms - indie rock band